Robert L. Jackson Jr. is a former member of the Wisconsin State Assembly.

Biography
Jackson was born on February 20, 1936, in Red Wing, Minnesota. After graduating from high school in Grinnell, Iowa, Jackson attended St. Ambrose University and the University of Wisconsin-Madison. He is married with three children.

Career
Jackson was elected to the Assembly in 1968 and 1970. He is a Democrat.

References

People from Red Wing, Minnesota
People from Grinnell, Iowa
Democratic Party members of the Wisconsin State Assembly
St. Ambrose University alumni
University of Wisconsin–Madison alumni
1936 births
Living people